Flossach is a  river in Bavaria, Germany. It is a right tributary of the Mindel and an indirect right tributary of the Danube.

Geography
It flows in a northwesterly direction through a broad valley, formed during the last glacial times. The main Flossach branch flows through the towns of Tussenhausen and Zaisertshofen; the other branch (called the Lettenbach or Lehnbachof) flows through Mattsiesmühle (north of Mattsies) and along the Mindelheim-Mattsies airfield.

Places in the Flossach Valley
Gerum (Rammingen )
Mattsies and Mattsiesmühle (Tussenhausen ) 
Tussenhausen
Zaisertshofen (Tussenhausen )

Towns along the Flossach
Salgen (located on the Eastern Mindel)
Mörgen (Eppishausen)
Bronnen (Salgen, located on the Eastern Mindel)
Spöck (Kirchheim in Schwaben)
Bronnerlehe (Salgen, located on the Eastern Mindel) 
Diepenhofen (Kirchheim in Schwaben)
Kirchheim in Schwaben
Dern (Kirchheim in Schwaben)
Hasberg (Kirchheim in Schwaben, located on the Mindel)

See also
List of rivers of Bavaria

References

Rivers of Bavaria
Rivers of Germany